Presidential elections were held in Poland on 5 November 1995, with a second round on 19 November. The leader of Social Democracy, Aleksander Kwaśniewski, and incumbent President Lech Wałęsa advanced to the second round. Kwaśniewski won the election with 52% of the vote in the run-off against 48% for Wałęsa.

Background
The two favorites throughout the course of the campaign were the leader of the post-communist SLD Aleksander Kwaśniewski and incumbent President Lech Wałęsa. Kwaśniewski ran a campaign of change and blamed the economic problems in Poland on the post-Solidarity right. His campaign slogan was "Let's choose the future" (Wybierzmy przyszłość). Political opponents challenged his candidacy, and produced evidence to show that he had lied about his education in registration documents and public presentations. There was also some mystery over his graduation from university.  A law court confirmed that Kwaśniewski had lied about his record, but did not penalize him for it, judging the information irrelevant to the election result. Meanwhile, Wałęsa was a very unpopular President and some opinion polls even showed that he might not make it into the second round. He was challenged by other post-Solidarity politicians of all sides of the political spectrum ranging from liberal former Minister of Labour and Social Policy Jacek Kuroń to ultraconservative former Prime Minister Jan Olszewski. Rather than focusing on his presidency, he focused on his personal image as an everyday man turned international hero that was created for him while he was chairman of Solidarity. His campaign slogan was "There are many candidates but there is only one Lech Wałęsa" (Kandydatów jest wielu – Lech Wałęsa tylko jeden).

Candidates

Jurist Tadeusz Koźluk (Independent), 65 
Mechanic Kazimierz Piotrowicz (Independent), 51

Withdrawn 

Businessman Bogdan Pawłowski (Independent), 50

Results
Kwaśniewski won with 51.7 percent of votes in the run-off. 64.7% of citizens cast their votes during the first round, 98.2% of those were valid. 68.2% of citizens cast their vote during the second round, 98.0% of those were valid.

References

Obwieszczenie PKW z dn. 7 XI 1995 r., Dziennik Ustaw Nr 126, poz. 604;
Obwieszczenie PKW z dn. 7 XI 1995 r., Dz.U. Nr 131, poz. 636

 
Presidential elections in Poland
Poland
History of Poland (1989–present)
President
Poland